S114 may refer to :
 County Route S114 (New Jersey), a county route in Bergen county
 S114 road in Amsterdam
 Greek submarine Papanikolis (S-114) (1972-1992), a Balao class submarine